is a 1942 Japanese film directed by Satsuo Yamamoto. It was co-written by Akira Kurosawa.

Cast
 Joji Oka 
 Takako Irie 
 Ranko Hanai 
 Heihachiro Okawa 
 Seizaburō Kawazu 
 Takuzō Kumagai 
 Akio Kusama

References

External links 
 

Japanese black-and-white films
1942 films
Films directed by Satsuo Yamamoto
Japanese aviation films